Maroubra could refer to:

Places in Australia
 Maroubra Beach, a beach in Maroubra, Sydney, Australia
 Maroubra, New South Wales, a suburb in Sydney, Australia
 Maroubra Junction, New South Wales, an unbounded locality of the suburb of Maroubra in Sydney
 Electoral district of Maroubra, an electoral district of the Legislative Assembly in the Australian state of New South Wales

Genus 
 Maroubra (fish), a genus of pipefishes
 Maroubra perserrata
 Maroubra yasudai

Army
 Maroubra Force, an infantry force that defended Port Moresby